Nothing Left to Fear may refer to:

 Nothing Left to Fear (Destiny album), 1991
 Nothing Left to Fear (Andy Cherry album), 2012
 Nothing Left to Fear (film), a 2013 horror film